In the theory of functions of several complex variables, Hartogs's extension theorem is a statement about the singularities of holomorphic functions of several variables. Informally, it states that the support of the singularities of such functions cannot be compact, therefore the singular set of a function of several complex variables must (loosely speaking) 'go off to infinity' in some direction. More precisely, it shows that an isolated singularity is always a removable singularity  for any analytic function of  complex variables. A first version of this theorem was proved by Friedrich Hartogs, and as such it is known also as Hartogs's lemma and Hartogs's principle: in earlier Soviet literature, it is also called Osgood–Brown theorem, acknowledging later work by Arthur Barton Brown and William Fogg Osgood. This property of holomorphic functions of several variables is also called Hartogs's phenomenon: however, the locution "Hartogs's phenomenon" is also used to identify the property of solutions of systems of partial differential or convolution equations satisfying Hartogs type theorems.

Historical note
The original proof was given by Friedrich Hartogs in 1906, using Cauchy's integral formula for functions of several complex variables. Today, usual proofs rely on either the Bochner–Martinelli–Koppelman formula or the solution of the inhomogeneous Cauchy–Riemann equations with compact support. The latter approach is due to Leon Ehrenpreis who initiated it in the paper . Yet another very simple proof of this result was given by Gaetano Fichera in the paper , by using his solution of the Dirichlet problem for holomorphic functions of several variables and the related concept of CR-function: later he extended the theorem to a certain class of partial differential operators in the paper , and his ideas were later further explored by Giuliano Bratti. Also the Japanese school of the theory of partial differential operators worked much on this topic, with notable contributions by Akira Kaneko. Their approach is to use Ehrenpreis's fundamental principle.

Hartogs's phenomenon
For example, in two variables, consider the interior domain

in the two-dimensional polydisk  where  .

 
Such a phenomenon is called Hartogs's phenomenon, which lead to the notion of this Hartogs's extension theorem and the domain of holomorphy.

Formal statement and proof

The holomorphicity of this function is identical to the condition . For any smooth function , the differential (0,1)-form  is -closed.

On the set ,  is holomorphic since  is identically constant. Thus, on this open subset,  equals  and the existence part of Hartog's theorem is proved.

Counterexamples in dimension one
The theorem does not hold when . To see this, it suffices to consider the function , which is clearly holomorphic in  but cannot be continued as a holomorphic function on the whole . Therefore, the Hartogs's phenomenon is an elementary phenomenon that highlights the difference between the theory of functions of one and several complex variables.

Notes

References

Historical references
.
.
. A historical paper correcting some inexact historical statements in the theory of holomorphic functions of several variables, particularly concerning contributions of Gaetano Fichera and Francesco Severi.
. This is the first paper where a general solution to the Dirichlet problem for pluriharmonic functions is given for general real analytic data on a real analytic hypersurface. A translation of the title reads as:-"Solution of the general Dirichlet problem for biharmonic functions".
. A translation of the title is:-"Lectures on analytic functions of several complex variables – Lectured in 1956–57 at the Istituto Nazionale di Alta Matematica in Rome". This book consist of lecture notes from a course held by Francesco Severi at the Istituto Nazionale di Alta Matematica (which at present bears his name), and includes appendices of Enzo Martinelli, Giovanni Battista Rizza and Mario Benedicty.
.
 (Zentralblatt review of the original Russian edition). One of the first modern monographs on the theory of several complex variables, being different from other ones of the same period due to the extensive use of generalized functions.

Scientific references
. 
. 

. A fundamental paper in the theory of Hartogs's phenomenon. The typographical error in the title is reproduced as it appears in the original version of the paper.
. An epoch-making paper in the theory of CR-functions, where the Dirichlet problem for analytic functions of several complex variables is solved for general data. A translation of the title reads as:-"Characterization of the trace, on the boundary of a domain, of an analytic function of several complex variables".
. An English translation of the title reads as:-"Hartogs phenomenon for certain linear partial differential operators".
. Available at the SEALS Portal .
 (see also , the cumulative review of several papers by E. Trost). Available at the SEALS Portal .
.
. Available at the DigiZeitschriften.
.
, available at Project Euclid.
. Available at the SEALS Portal .
.
. An English translation of the title reads as:-"A fundamental property of the domain of holomorphy of an analytic function of one real variable and one complex variable".
. Available at the SEALS Portal .

External links

Several complex variables
Theorems in complex analysis